Alban Ramosaj (born 7 March 1996) is an Albanian singer, songwriter, producer, director, actor and photo-model. Born in Ede and raised in Tirana, he auditioned for the Albanian music competition The Voice of Albania in 2013.

Life and career

1996–2020: Early life and career beginnings 

Alban Ramosaj was born on 7 March 1996 into an Albanian family in the city of Ede, Netherlands. His family hails from Podujeva, Kosovo, although the singer grew up in Tirana, Albania. Ramosaj auditioned for the first series of X Factor Albania in 2012, singing "Kryptonite" for judges Besa Kokëdhima, Juliana Pasha, Pandi Laço and Alban Skënderaj. Continuing in 2013, the singer successfully participated in the third season of The Voice of Albania before his elimination in the quarter-finals. He later went on to appear on the third series of the Televizioni Klan (TV Klan) dance show "Dance With Me Albania". He released his extended play Po nese to critical acclaim in 2016. In November 2017, he was the opening act for Scottish singer Emeli Sandé's concert in Tirana.

2021–present: Kënga Magjike and continued success 

Merging pop and R&B elements, his follow-up single, Shpirto, was released in July 2021 and reached number 4 in the Albanian Top 100.

Artistry 

Ramosaj is regarded as a pop artist experimenting with different music genres, including R&B.

Discography

Extended plays 
 Po nese... (2016)
 Hiraeth (2018)

As lead artist

References 

1996 births
21st-century Albanian male singers
Albanian male models
Albanian pop singers
Albanian songwriters
Festivali i Këngës contestants
Kënga Magjike winners
Kosovan models
Dutch people of Kosovan descent
Kosovo Albanians
Living people
Musicians from Tirana
People from Ede, Netherlands